Desoria is a genus of springtails.

References 

 Fjellberg, A. 2010: Cryophilic Isotomidae (Collembola) of the Northwestern Rocky Mountains, U.S.A. Zootaxa, 2513, pages 27–49
 Lim, M.-H. & K.-H. Park, 2011: New species of Desoria (Collembola: Isotomidae) from Korea. Entomological Research 41 (3), pages 95–97,

External links 
 
 

Springtail genera